Point Chautauqua Historic District is a national historic district located on Point Chautauqua, three miles (5 km) from Mayville in Chautauqua County, New York. It is located approximately due north, upwards and to the left, across Chautauqua Lake from the Chautauqua Institution. The district is a planned resort community laid out in 1875 by Frederick Law Olmsted as a Baptist camp meeting.  Within a generation, it had become a resort community.  The  district includes the serpentine street system, which ascends the steeply wooded slopes of the site, and its collection of single family residences developed in the late 19th and early 20th century. Among the architectural styles represented are American Craftsman, Queen Anne, and Carpenter Gothic.

It was listed on the National Register of Historic Places in 1996.

References

Historic districts on the National Register of Historic Places in New York (state)
Queen Anne architecture in New York (state)
Historic districts in Chautauqua County, New York
National Register of Historic Places in Chautauqua County, New York
Camp meeting grounds
Baptist Christianity in New York (state)